Frank W. Haskell (1843 – October 9, 1903) was a member of the United States Army, who fought for the Union in the American Civil War, and was a Civil War Medal of Honor recipient. He was born in 1843 in Benton, Maine. He entered into the United States Army in Waterville, Maine. Haskell became a Sergeant Major in the 3rd Maine Volunteer Infantry Regiment. Sergeant Major Haskell was awarded the Medal of Honor for heroism on June 1, 1862, at Fair Oaks, Virginia. He is cited to have "assumed command of a portion of the left wing of his regiment," after all other officers had been killed or disabled. He then "led it gallantly across a stream and contributed most effectively to the success of the action." The Medal of Honor was issued to Haskell on December 8, 1898. Haskell died on October 9, 1903, in Kalispell, Montana, and was buried at Pine Grove Cemetery in Waterville, Maine.

See also
Peninsula Campaign
Battle of Fair Oaks
3rd Maine Volunteer Infantry Regiment

Notes

References

External links

United States Army Medal of Honor recipients
American Civil War recipients of the Medal of Honor
1843 births
1903 deaths
People from Benton, Maine
Union Army officers